Rhamdella is a genus of three-barbeled catfishes native to South America.

Species
There are currently 9 recognized species in this genus:
 Rhamdella aymarae Miquelarena & Menni, 1999
 Rhamdella cainguae Bockmann & Miquelarena, 2008
 Rhamdella eriarcha C. H. Eigenmann & R. S. Eigenmann, 1888
 Rhamdella exsudans Jenyns, 1842
 Rhamdella jenynsii Günther, 1864
 Rhamdella longiuscula C. A. S. de Lucena & J. F. P. da Silva, 1991
 Rhamdella montana C. H. Eigenmann, 1913
 Rhamdella rusbyi N. E. Pearson, 1924
 Rhamdella zelimai R. E. dos Reis, L. R. Malabarba & C. A. S. de Lucena , 2014

References

Heptapteridae
Fish of South America
Catfish genera
Taxa named by Carl H. Eigenmann
Taxa named by Rosa Smith Eigenmann
Freshwater fish genera